The Lone Star Conference women's basketball tournament is the annual conference women's basketball championship tournament for the Lone Star Conference. The tournament has been held annually since 1983. It is a single-elimination tournament and seeding is based on regular season records.

The winner receives the Lone Star Conference's automatic bid to the NCAA Division II women's basketball tournament.

Results

Championship records

 Arkansas–Fort Smith, Cameron, Dallas Baptist,  Oklahoma Christian, St. Edward's, St. Mary's (TX), Texas A&M International, UT Permian Basin, UT Tyler, and Western New Mexico have yet to qualify for the tournament finals.
 East Central, Ouachita Baptist, Southwest Texas State (Texas State), Southwestern Oklahoma State, Stephen F. Austin, and Sul Ross State never qualified for the tournament finals as Lone Star Conference members.
 Schools highlighted in pink are former members of the Lone Star Conference

See also
Lone Star Conference men's basketball tournament

References

NCAA Division II women's basketball conference tournaments
Tournament
Recurring sporting events established in 1983